Salome Wanjala  (born ) is a retired Kenyan female volleyball player, who played as a wing spiker.

She was part of the Kenya women's national volleyball team at the 2002 FIVB Volleyball Women's World Championship in Germany. On club level she played with Kenya Commercial Bank.

Clubs
 Kenya Commercial Bank (2002)

References

1985 births
Living people
Kenyan women's volleyball players
Place of birth missing (living people)